The Slum Stars is a 2017 Indian children's film directed by Sandeep Singh Bawa and produced by Harpreet Kaur Dhillon. The film has a multiple cast of debuting child-artists. The film was shot in and around Chandigarh, and in the Punjab and Rajasthan.

Plot
The film is about a gang of innocent abandoned kids named Kahaniya, Gudiya and Chandu who lead troubled lives in slums. The Child trafficker; Ghutan, a local don and his keep Surma use their terror to sell these kids. Ghutan is controlled by a bogus Swami a criminal who fakes himself as a spiritual leader. Swami is led by Netaji, a greedy politician who has an upper hand in all the crimes.

When Gudiya becomes one of the victim forced by Surma into sexual exploitation, these kids decide to run away from these people who are trying destroying their lives. They somehow travel from the city through dusty roads that lead them into a village in Rajasthan where they meet a Ghost. This ghost then helps the kids to teach Ghutan, Surma, Netaji and other criminal a lesson through his powers.

Cast 
 Chiragdeep Gill as Kahaniya
 Ridhima Malhotra as Gudiya
 Yashwan Chopra as Chandu
 GurpreetSingh Tuti as Dharam Guru
 Abhiraj Singh Thakur as Kala Dhan
 Survinder Vicky as MLA
 Balkar Singh Dhillon as Retired Army Officer
 Naginder as Sekh
 Amrit Pal Chotu as Ghost
 KapilKalyan as Koyla
 Rakshit as Genda
 Harpreet Singh as Sursand
 Harry Sachdev as Ghutan
 GoniSagoo as Surma
 Daman PreetKuar as KhaniyaMaa
 Nitin Arora as Gunda
 DarshanGharoo as Dhaba Owner
 Bhuwan Azad as Surdass
 JagdeepLamba as Truck Driver
 Nikk Arora as Truck Driver asst.

References

External links

 Official Trailer on YouTube

2017 films